Ampelita is a genus of air-breathing land snails, terrestrial pulmonate gastropod mollusks in the family Acavidae.

Species
Species within the genus Ampelita include:
 Ampelita alluaudi (Dautzenberg, 1895)
 Ampelita ambatoensis Emberton & Griffiths, 2009
 Ampelita andriamamonjyi Griffiths & Herbert, 2013
 Ampelita atropos (Férussac, 1840)
 Ampelita bathiei Fischer-Piette, 1952
 Ampelita battistinii Fischer-Piette & Garreau, 1965
 Ampelita beanka Griffiths & Herbert, 2013
 Ampelita bizonalis Odhner, 1919
 Ampelita caderyi Fischer-Piette, Blanc, C.P., Blanc, F. & Salvat, 1994
 Ampelita caduca Fischer-Piette, Blanc, F. & Salvat, 1975
 Ampelita calida Fischer-Piette, Blanc, F. & Salvat, 1975
 Ampelita calypso (L. Pfeiffer, 1861)
 Ampelita chlorozona (Grateloup, 1840)
 Ampelita clotho (Férussac, 1840)
 Ampelita consanguinea (Férussac, 1840)
 Ampelita covani (E. A. Smith, 1879) 
 Ampelita culminans Fischer-Piette, 1952
 Ampelita decaryi Fischer-Piette, 1952
 Ampelita denisi Dautzenberg, 1928
 Ampelita dingeoni Fischer-Piette, Blanc, F. & Salvat, 1975
 Ampelita duvalii (Petit de la Saussaye, 1844)
 Ampelita fulgurata (Sowerby, 1838)
 Ampelita funebris (Morelet, 1877)
 Ampelita futura Fischer-Piette & Garreau, 1965
 Ampelita galactostoma (L. Pfeiffer, 1849)
 Ampelita gaudens (Mabille, 1884)
 Ampelita globulus Fischer-Piette, Blanc, F. & Vukadinovic, 1974
 Ampelita grandidieri Fischer-Piette, 1952
 Ampelita granulosa (Férussac, 1840)
 Ampelita julii Fischer-Piette & Garreau, 1965 - Ampelita julii soa Emberton & Griffiths, 2009
 Ampelita lachesis (Férussac, 1840)
 Ampelita lamarei (Pfeiffer, 1853)
 Ampelita lancula (Férussac, 1821)
 Ampelita lindae Griffiths & Herbert, 2013
 Ampelita lourdoni Fischer-Piette, Blanc, C.P., Blanc, F. & Salvat, 1994
 Ampelita madagascariensis (Lamarck, 1816)
 Ampelita madecassina (Férussac, 1821)
 Ampelita milloti Fischer-Piette, 1952
 Ampelita namerokoensis Fischer-Piette, 1952
 Ampelita neoglobulus Fischer-Piette, Blanc, C.P., Blanc, F. & Salvat, 1994
 Ampelita omphalolodes (L. Pfeiffer, 1845)
 Ampelita owengriffithsi
 Ampelita parva Fischer-Piette & Garreau, 1965
 Ampelita percyana (E. A. Smith, 1880)
 Ampelita petiti Fischer-Piette, 1952
 Ampelita pfeifferi Fischer-Piette, 1952
 Ampelita pilosa Fischer-Piette & Garreau, 1965
 Ampelita robillardi (H. Adams & Angas, 1876)
 Ampelita sepulcralis (Férussac, 1821)
 Ampelita shavi E. A. Smith, 1879
 Ampelita soulaiana Fischer Cauquoin Tes, 1973
 Ampelita stilpna (Mabille, 1884)
 Ampelita stumpfii (Kobelt, 1880)
 Ampelita suarezensis (Crosse & Fischer, 1877)
 Ampelita subatropos (Dautzenberg, 1894)
 Ampelita subsepulcralis (Crosse, 1868)
 Ampelita sylvatica Fischer-Piette & Garreau, 1965
 Ampelita unicolor (L. Pfeiffer, 1845)
 Ampelita vanoci Fischer-Piette, Blanc, C.P., Blanc, F. & Salvat, 1994
 Ampelita vesconis (Morelet, 1851)
 Ampelita xystera (L. Pfeiffer, 1841)

References

 Bank, R. (2017). Classification of the Recent terrestrial Gastropoda of the World. Last update: July 16th, 2017

External links
 

Acavidae
Taxonomy articles created by Polbot